Estelle Lucille Basor (born 1947) is an American mathematician interested in operator theory and the theory of random matrices.
She is professor emeritus of mathematics at the California Polytechnic State University (Cal Poly), and deputy director of the American Institute of Mathematics.

Education and career
Basor earned a bachelor's degree in mathematics from the University of California, Santa Cruz in 1969, and completed a Ph.D. there in 1975.
Her dissertation, supervised by Harold Widom, was Asymptotic Formulas for Toeplitz Determinants.

She joined the Cal Poly faculty in 1976, and taught there until retiring in 2008.

Recognition
At Cal Poly, she was the 2005 winner of the Distinguished Research, Creative Activity and Professional Development Award, and a colloquium in her honor was held in 2006.
She was elected to the 2018 class of fellows of the American Mathematical Society.

Personal life
Basor's husband, Kent E. Morrison, is also a mathematician who went to school with her at Santa Cruz, worked with her at Cal Poly, and is now associated with the American Institute of Mathematics.

References

External links
Home page

Place of birth missing (living people)
Living people
20th-century American mathematicians
21st-century American mathematicians
American women mathematicians
University of California, Santa Cruz alumni
California Polytechnic State University faculty
Fellows of the American Mathematical Society
20th-century women mathematicians
1947 births
21st-century women mathematicians
20th-century American women
21st-century American women